Nataša Lačen (born 3 December 1971 in Črna na Koroškem) is a Slovenian cross country skier who competed from 1993 to 2003. Her best World Cup finish was 12th twice with one each in 2001 and in 2002.

Lačen also competed in two Winter Olympics, earning her best finish of ninth in the 4 × 5 km relay at Salt Lake City in 2002. Her best finish at the FIS Nordic World Ski Championships was 17th in the 30 km event at Val di Fiemme in 2003.

Cross-country skiing results
All results are sourced from the International Ski Federation (FIS).

Olympic Games

World Championships

a.  Cancelled due to extremely cold weather.

World Cup

Season standings

References

External links
 

1971 births
Cross-country skiers at the 1998 Winter Olympics
Cross-country skiers at the 2002 Winter Olympics
Living people
Olympic cross-country skiers of Slovenia
Slovenian female cross-country skiers
People from the Municipality of Črna na Koroškem